The Global 2000 Report to the President was a 1980 report commissioned by President Jimmy Carter. It warned that world population growth would have dramatic consequences by the year 2000 if no changes in public policy were made. Physicist Gerald O. Barney was the study director.

The press referred to these volumes as "The Doomsday Report". It was a historical first in trying to analyze the effects of population growth, pollution, and other factors on the worldwide environment and possible political crises. For example, Volume Two reviewed the potential for global warming and climate change. However, the year the Global 2000 Report was published, 1980, was also when Jimmy Carter lost his bid for a second term as President and Ron Reagan effectively dismissed these concerns.

References

External links
 The Global 2000 Report to the President: Volume 1 (full PDF, archived)
 The Global 2000 Report to the President: Volume 2 (full PDF, archived)
 The Global 2000 Report to the President: Volume 3 (full PDF, archived)
 The Global 2000 Report to the President: Major findings and conclusions (archived copy)

1981 non-fiction books
Environmental non-fiction books
Environmental reports
1981 in the environment